"I Remember U" is a song performed by Estonian DJ Trio Cartoon featuring vocals from Estonian singer Jüri Pootsmann. The song was released as a digital download on March 11, 2016 through NoCopyrightSounds. The song peaked to number 1 on the Estonian Airplay Chart. The song is now used as the ADVChina YouTube channel theme tune.

Track listing

Chart performance

Release history

References

2016 songs
2016 singles
Jüri Pootsmann songs